Stephané Mvibudulu (born 18 May 1993) is a German-Congolese professional footballer who plays as a forward for 1. FC Bocholt.

Club career
During his youth Mvibudulu played for Lokomotive Leipzig and Halle. He played his first professional matches for Halle II before transferring to 1860 Munich II in the Regionalliga Bayern at the start of the 2013–14 season. He made his first appearance for 1860 Munich on 8 August 2015 at a 2–0 home win against Hoffenheim in the first round of the DFB-Pokal, when being substituted for Rubin Okotie in the 82nd minute. Subsequently, he gave his 2. Bundesliga debut on 17 August 2015 against Nuremberg. He moved to the Stuttgarter Kickers on 11 January 2016.

Career statistics

References

External links
 Stephané Mvibudulu at kicker 

1993 births
Living people
German footballers
German sportspeople of Democratic Republic of the Congo descent
Democratic Republic of the Congo expatriate footballers
Democratic Republic of the Congo footballers
Association football defenders
TSV 1860 Munich players
TSV 1860 Munich II players
Stuttgarter Kickers players
SV Wehen Wiesbaden players
SG Sonnenhof Großaspach players
FC Rot-Weiß Erfurt players
1. FC Lokomotive Leipzig players
BSG Chemie Leipzig (1997) players
1. FC Bocholt players
2. Bundesliga players
3. Liga players
Regionalliga players
Footballers from Leipzig